EuroAir was an airline based in Athens, Greece. It operated business charter flights using its own and wet leased aircraft. Its main base was Athens International Airport. EuroAir ceased operations when it had its  AOC suspended on 16 March 2009.

History 

The airline was established and started operations in 1995. Operations began with air taxi, charter flights, helicopter flights and air ambulance services. EuroAir ceased operations when it had its AOC suspended on 16 March 2009.

Destinations
In 2007 it operated an MD-83 on behalf of On Air (Pescara) on twice-weekly services from Pescara to Brussels Charleroi, Bucharest, Heraklion, Paris CDG and Split.

Fleet 
EuroAir operated the following:
2 × McDonnel Douglas MD-83
1 × Let L-410 Turbolet
1 × Embraer EMB-110

References

External links

EuroAir
EuroAir amateur fleet list

Defunct airlines of Greece
Airlines established in 1995
Airlines disestablished in 2009
Greek companies established in 1995
2009 disestablishments in Greece